Delta Piscium (δ Piscium) is a solitary, orange-hued star in the zodiac constellation of Pisces. It has an apparent visual magnitude of +4.4, so it is bright enough to be faintly visible to the naked eye. The visual magnitude of the star is diminished by an interstellar absorption factor of 0.08 due to interstellar dust.

This is an evolved K-type giant star with a stellar classification of K4 IIIb. It has around 1.65 times the mass of the Sun and, at the age of three billion years, has expanded to 44 times the Sun's radius. The star is radiating 447 times the Sun's luminosity from its enlarged photosphere at an effective temperature of 3,963 K.

Because Delta Piscium is positioned near the ecliptic, so it is subject to lunar occultations. It has a magnitude 13.99 visual companion at an angular separation of 135.0 arc seconds on a position angle of 12°, as of 2011.

Naming

References

External links
 

K-type giants
Piscium, Delta
Wài Píng yī
Pisces (constellation)
Durchmusterung objects
Piscium, 063
004656
003786
0224